I Am Sam is the soundtrack to the 2001 film I Am Sam. It was released on January 8, 2002 by V2 Records (see 2002 in music). The album contents are made up entirely of cover versions of songs by The Beatles, although it was originally intended to consist of the group's original recordings. When producers were unable to obtain the rights to the original tracks, they commissioned the artists featured on the album to record the versions released.

Track listing
All tracks written by Lennon–McCartney, except "Here Comes the Sun" and "If I Needed Someone", which were written by George Harrison.
"Two of Us", performed by Aimee Mann and Michael Penn – 3:30
"Blackbird", performed by Sarah McLachlan – 2:21
"Across the Universe", performed by Rufus Wainwright – 4:08
"I'm Looking Through You", performed by The Wallflowers – 2:39
"You've Got to Hide Your Love Away", performed by Eddie Vedder – 2:09
"Strawberry Fields Forever", performed by Ben Harper – 4:26
"Mother Nature's Son", performed by Sheryl Crow – 2:42
"Golden Slumbers", performed by Ben Folds – 1:41
"I'm Only Sleeping", performed by The Vines – 3:05
"Don't Let Me Down", performed by Stereophonics – 4:08
"Lucy in the Sky with Diamonds", performed by The Black Crowes – 3:50
"Julia", performed by Chocolate Genius – 4:34
"We Can Work It Out", performed by Heather Nova – 2:15
"Help!", performed by Howie Day – 3:33
"Nowhere Man", performed by Paul Westerberg – 3:29
"Revolution", performed by Grandaddy – 3:02
"Let It Be", performed by Nick Cave – 3:30
 Bonus Tracks (European Edition):

 Korean Bonus Tracks (Korean Edition):

 Japanese Bonus Tracks (Japanese Edition):

Charts

Weekly charts

Year-end charts

Certifications

See also
I Am Sam
All This and World War II
This Bird Has Flown - A 40th Anniversary Tribute to the Beatles' Rubber Soul
Sgt. Pepper Knew My Father
Sgt. Pepper's Lonely Hearts Club Band (film)
Sgt. Pepper's Lonely Hearts Club Band (soundtrack)

References

Drama film soundtracks
The Beatles tribute albums
Albums produced by Rob Schnapf
2002 soundtrack albums
V2 Records soundtracks
Rock soundtracks